Semilabeo is a genus of cyprinid fishes found in rivers and streams in China and Vietnam.  There are currently two recognized species in this genus.

Species
 Semilabeo notabilis W. K. H. Peters, 1881
 Semilabeo obscurus R. D. Lin, 1981

References
 

Labeoninae
Fish of Asia
Taxa named by Wilhelm Peters